TORO-Q was a sightseeing open-air train operated by JR Kyushu between Yufuin and Minami-Yufu on the Kyūdai Main Line.

History 
The train started operation in October 2002.

Due to the rolling stock's increasing age, the service was suspended on November 29, 2009. Commemorative boarding passes were distributed from November 7.

Operation 
In the morning, a single Rapid service (not using the TORO-Q name) between Ōita and Yufuin was operated. The train would then make 5 round trips between Yufuin and Minami-Yufu, and then return to Ōita running as a Rapid service again.

Rolling stock 

The train was formed of five vehicles, with a railcar (KiHa 65 36 and KiHa 58 569) at both ends of the trains, and three open-air cars based on the ToRa 70000 series between.

After the suspension 

Both railcars used for the TORO-Q were restored to the JNR express color scheme after the service was suspended, and they were then used in heritage and event trains

References 

This article incorporates material from the corresponding article on the Japanese wikipedia.

Named passenger trains of Japan
Kyushu Railway Company
Railway services introduced in 2002
Railway services discontinued in 2009